Noyarey is a commune in the Isère department in southeastern France. It is part of the Grenoble urban unit (agglomeration).

Population

Twin towns — sister cities
Noyarey is twinned with:

  Merone, Italy (2004)

See also
Parc naturel régional du Vercors
Communes of the Isère department

References

Communes of Isère
Isère communes articles needing translation from French Wikipedia